Victor Doblas Heringer (March 27, 1988 – March 7, 2018) was a Brazilian Prêmio Jabuti-winning novelist, translator, chronicler and poet, famous for his novels Glória (2012) and O Amor dos Homens Avulsos (2016).

Biography
Victor Doblas Heringer was born on March 27, 1988, to a family of German descent in Rio de Janeiro, in the bairro (neighborhood) of São Cristóvão, but was raised in Nova Friburgo. Graduated in Literature from the Federal University of Rio de Janeiro, before publishing his first books he worked at the Instituto Moreira Salles and at the Fundação Casa de Rui Barbosa after obtaining a scholarship for the latter. Between 2014 and 2017 he had a weekly column in the magazine Pessoa, and also periodically wrote for the Pernambuco-based magazine Continente, among many others.

Heringer's debut work, the poetry anthology Automatógrafo, was released through 7Letras in 2011. The following year, he published the critically acclaimed novel Glória, about a "plastic artist searching for an impossible woman", for which he received the prestigious Prêmio Jabuti in 2013. Heringer's second novel, O Amor dos Homens Avulsos, came out in 2016 through Companhia das Letras, and tells the story "of two boys who fall in love with each other, but have their passion interrupted by a tragedy"; it was nominated for the Prêmio Rio de Literatura, the São Paulo Prize for Literature and the Prêmio Oceanos. He claims that the fictional neighborhood in which the novel takes place was inspired by the real-life neighborhood of Del Castilho in Rio de Janeiro, where he used to visit his grandmother when he was a kid.

Heringer's final work to be published during his lifetime was a translation to Portuguese of Loung Ung's 2000 memoir First They Killed My Father, which came out in Brazil in 2017 through HarperCollins. The same year, he was included by Forbes Brasil in their "UNDER 30 in Literature" list.

Throughout most of his life Heringer struggled with depression. On March 7, 2018, three weeks prior to his 30th birthday, he was found dead near his apartment in Copacabana following an apparent suicide by self-defenestration. On June 9, 2018, his publisher Companhia das Letras announced that, as a tribute to him, they would re-issue all of his works; they had already re-published his first novel Glória some months prior, and a complete anthology of his poems was originally announced to be released in 2019. In one of his final interviews, from October 2017, he stated that he was working on a third novel, scheduled to be published in 2018 and inspired by his travels across South America, India and Indonesia, but it is unknown if he was able to finish it prior to his death.

A posthumous collection containing seventy of Heringer's crônicas, Vida Desinteressante, came out through Companhia das Letras in 2021.

Bibliography
Poetry
 Automatógrafo (7Letras, 2011)

Novels
 Glória (7Letras, 2012; re-issued by Companhia das Letras in 2018)
 O Amor dos Homens Avulsos (Companhia das Letras, 2016)

Crônicas
 Vida Desinteressante (Companhia das Letras, 2021; posthumous)

Translation
 Primeiro Mataram Meu Pai (HarperCollins, 2017)

References

1988 births
2018 deaths
2018 suicides
21st-century Brazilian poets
Writers from Rio de Janeiro (city)
Federal University of Rio de Janeiro alumni
21st-century Brazilian novelists
Brazilian male poets
Portuguese-language writers
Brazilian male novelists
21st-century Brazilian male writers
21st-century translators
English–Portuguese translators
Brazilian people of German descent
Suicides by jumping in Brazil
People from Nova Friburgo